Christelle Laura Douibi (born 24 November 1985 in Grenoble) is an Algerian alpine skier at the 2006 Winter Olympics. She dedicated her first race to her deceased father Mohammed. She was also the nation's flag bearer, and the only woman to represent Africa at the 2006 Winter Olympics.

External links
Article on long-shot athletes

1985 births
Living people
Algerian female alpine skiers
Alpine skiers at the 2006 Winter Olympics
Olympic alpine skiers of Algeria
Sportspeople from Grenoble
21st-century Algerian people